Memphis is a 2013 musical drama film, directed by Tim Sutton. The film stars Willis Earl Beal in the lead role of talented singer.

The film had its premiere at the 70th Venice International Film Festival on August 31, 2013. The film was also awarded the cinema funding grant by Venice Biennale College.

The film later screened at 2014 Sundance Film Festival on January 17, 2014. Vimeo acquired the exclusive 30-day worldwide digital window on the film, while Kino Lorber will theatrically release the film.

Plot
A singer drifts through Memphis city on a journey of self-discovery.

Cast
Willis Earl Beal
Wole Parks as Michael Jordan
Todd Williams as Chad
Constance Brantley 
Larry Dodson
Devonte Hull 
Lopaka Thomas 
John Gary Williams
Lainie Kazan as Mary
Curtis Armstrong as Jake

Reception
Memphis received mostly positive reviews from critics. Justin Lowe in his review for The Hollywood Reporter called it "A film of quiet intensity and poetic imagery." Rob Nelson of Variety, praised the film by saying that "(it) is a digressive, daringly experimental study of a flailing musician, magnetically played by accomplished bluesman and poet Willis Earl Beal."

See also
List of black films of the 2010s

References

External links
 
 

2013 films
2010s musical drama films
Films about music and musicians
African-American musical drama films
Films about race and ethnicity
Films set in Memphis, Tennessee
Films shot in Tennessee
2013 drama films
2010s English-language films
2010s American films